Werk Arena is an indoor sporting arena located in Třinec, Czech Republic. The capacity of the arena is 5,400 people.

History
The arena was built in 2014. It is currently home to the HC Oceláři Třinec ice hockey team. Also, it hosted the Czech Republic men's tennis team at the 2016 Davis Cup World Group. The name refers to the Třinec Iron and Steel Works (called Werk in the regional dialect), the main sponsor of the hockey club.

Werk Arena co-hosted the 2020 World Junior Ice Hockey Championships along with Ostrava's Ostravar Aréna.

External links
 http://www.hcocelari.cz/zobraz.asp?t=stadion

Indoor ice hockey venues in the Czech Republic
Sport in Třinec
Sports venues in the Moravian-Silesian Region
2014 establishments in the Czech Republic
Sports venues completed in 2014
21st-century architecture in the Czech Republic